Gary Robertson may refer to:

 Gary Robertson (author), Scottish poet and author
 Gary Robertson (cricketer) (born 1960), New Zealand cricketer
 Gary Robertson (rower) (born 1950), New Zealand rower